Robert Doughty Weeks (July 8, 1795 – June 16, 1854) was an American banker who was a founder and president of the New York Stock Exchange.

Early life
Weeks was born on July 8, 1795 in Oyster Bay, New York. He was a son of James Huggins Weeks of Cove Hill in Oyster Bay and Miriam (née Doughty) Weeks (1765–1854).

His maternal grandparents were Elizabeth and Charles Doughty, and his paternal grandparents were Jotham Weeks and Sarah (née Huggins) Weeks.

Career
A found and member of the New York Stock Exchange, Weeks served as president of the Exchange twice, first from 1834 to 1835 (when he was succeeded by Edward Prime), and second from 1836 to 1837, when he was succeeded by David Clarkson.

Personal life
Weeks married twice. He married his first wife, Julia Hall Brasher (1802–1828), a daughter of Gasherie Brasher, on January 14, 1819. Together, they were the parents of:

 John Abeel Weeks (1820–1900), who married Alice Hathaway Delano, a distant cousin of Franklin D. Roosevelt, in 1849.
 Julia Mary Weeks (1827–1896), who married Henry Grant DeForest.

After her death, Weeks was married to Harriet Thompson Strong (1801–1864), a daughter of Benjamin Franklin Strong and Sarah (née Weeks) Strong, in 1832.  Together, they were the parents of:

 Sarah Strong Weeks (1833–1863), who married Edwin Carnes.
 Benjamin Strong Weeks (1834–1902)
 James Weeks (1836–1921), who married Kezia Seabury.
 Francis H. Weeks (1844–1913)

Weeks died on June 16, 1854 in Oyster Bay, New York.

Descendants
Through his eldest son John, he was a grandfather of Sarah Carnes Weeks (1863–1956), the first wife of Francis L. V. Hoppin, an architect and artist.

Through his daughter Julia, he was a grandfather of Henry Wheeler DeForest (1855–1938), who became a railroad executive, capitalist and industrialist, and Robert Weeks DeForest (1848–1931), a lawyer, financier, and philanthropist. Weeks was buried at Green-Wood Cemetery in Brooklyn.

References

External links

1795 births
1854 deaths
American bankers
Presidents of the New York Stock Exchange
19th-century American businesspeople
Burials at Green-Wood Cemetery